A threshold is the sill of a door. Some cultures attach special symbolism to a threshold. It is called a door saddle in New England.

Etymology

Various popular false etymologies of this word exist, some of which were even recorded by dictionaries in the past and even created by early linguists before linguistics became a strictly scientific field. Some of these false etymologies date from the time of Old English or even earlier.

Many different forms of this word are attested in Old English, which shows that the original meaning of this word and especially of its latter half was already obscure at the time and that most or all of the different Old English spellings were the result of folk etymologies. Although modern dictionaries do not yet record the results of the latest etymological research on this word, they do record the results of older research that shows that the second half is not related to the modern word hold. According to the linguist Anatoly Liberman, the most likely etymology is that the term referred to a threshing area that was originally not part of the doorway but was later associated with it:

Cultural symbolism
In many cultures it has a special symbolism: for instance, in Poland, Ukraine and Russia it is considered bad luck to shake hands or kiss across the threshold when meeting somebody. In many countries it is considered good luck for a bridegroom to carry the bride over the threshold to their new home.

References

Doors
Superstitions
Architectural elements